Kristof Serrand is a French animator. He is a supervising animator of Netflix.

Biography 
He studied at the Gobelins School of the Image, before joining Gaumont and then DreamWorks, in 1995 and now since 2020 in Netflix.

Filmography 
Abominable (2019)
How to Train Your Dragon: The Hidden World (2019)
Bird Karma (2018)
Kung Fu Panda 3 (2016)
Penguins of Madagascar (2014)
How to Train Your Dragon 2 (2014)
The Croods (2013)
How to Train Your Dragon (2010)
Over the Hedge (2006)
Shark Tale (2004)
Sinbad: Legend of the Seven Seas (2003)
Spirit: Stallion of the Cimarron (2002)
The Road to El Dorado (2000)
The Prince of Egypt (1998)
Balto (1995)
We're Back!: A Dinosaur's Story (1993)
An American Tail: Fievel Goes West (1991)
Astérix et le coup du menhir (1989)
La table tournante (1988) 
Astérix chez les Bretons (1986)
Astérix et la surprise de César (1985)
Dessine-moi un marin  (1984)

Awards 
Nominated for Character Animation in a Feature Production : Over the Hedge at 34th Annie Awards

References

External links 

DreamWorks animations : L’interview de Kristof Serrand, supervising animator, Yourfilmbusiness
Annecy 2013 – Interview de Kristof Serrand (discussion libre), Team Focus on Animation

French animators
Anime character designers
French artists
Year of birth missing (living people)
Living people
DreamWorks Animation people